The Blackwall Mountains in Antarctica rise to , extending in a west-northwest–east-southeast direction for  and lying close south of Neny Fjord on the west coast of Graham Land. They are bounded to the east by Remus Glacier, to the south by Romulus Glacier, and are separated from Red Rock Ridge to the west by Safety Col. First roughly surveyed in 1936 by the British Graham Land Expedition under John Rymill, they were re-surveyed in 1948–49 by the Falkland Islands Dependencies Survey, and so named by them because the black cliffs of the mountains facing Rymill Bay remain snow free throughout the year.

References 

Mountain ranges of Graham Land
Fallières Coast